Děčín (1942–1945: Tetschen–Bodenbach) is a city in the Ústí nad Labem Region of the Czech Republic. It has about 47,000 inhabitants. It is the 7th largest municipality in the country by area.

Administrative parts
Děčín is made up of 35 city parts and villages:

Děčín I-Děčín
Děčín II-Nové Město
Děčín III-Staré Město
Děčín IV-Podmokly
Děčín V-Rozbělesy
Děčín VI-Letná
Děčín VII-Chrochvice
Děčín VIII-Dolní Oldřichov
Děčín IX-Bynov
Děčín X-Bělá
Děčín XI-Horní Žleb
Děčín XII-Vilsnice
Děčín XIII-Loubí
Děčín XIV-Dolní Žleb
Děčín XV-Prostřední Žleb
Děčín XVI-Přípeř
Děčín XVII-Jalůvčí
Děčín XVIII-Maxičky
Děčín XIX-Čechy
Děčín XX-Nová Ves
Děčín XXI-Horní Oldřichov
Děčín XXII-Václavov
Děčín XXIII-Popovice
Děčín XXIV-Krásný Studenec
Děčín XXV-Chmelnice
Děčín XXVI-Bechlejovice
Děčín XXVII-Březiny
Děčín XXVIII-Folknáře
Děčín XXIX-Hoštice nad Labem
Děčín XXX-Velká Veleň
Děčín XXXI-Křešice
Děčín XXXII-Boletice nad Labem
Děčín XXXIII-Nebočady
Děčín XXXIV-Chlum
Děčín XXXV-Lesná

Geography
The municipal territory borders Germany in the north. It lies in the transition zone between the Elbe Sandstone Mountains in the north and the Central Bohemian Uplands in the south.

The city proper lies at the confluence of the rivers Elbe and Ploučnice.

History

The Děčín area was settled by the Slavic tribe of the Děčané in the 9th century, whence its name. In the 10th century the Přemyslid dukes of Bohemia had a fortress built on the left bank of the Elbe ford, but after a flood, it was rebuilt on the right bank in 1059. A settlement on the trade route from the Ore Mountains in the west to the adjacent Upper Lusatia region was first mentioned in a 993 deed. King Ottokar II of Bohemia (1253–1278) had the town of Děčín laid out as an administrative centre of the surrounding estates after calling in German settlers.

It was under the control of the Lords of Wartenberg from 1305 until 1534, when it was bought by the rich Lord Rudolf von Bünau. This family introduced Protestantism to the region and the town flourished; however the Protestant belief was suppressed by the Habsburg kings in the course of the Counter-Reformation, and the Bünaus were driven out upon the 1620 Battle of White Mountain. In 1628 they sold the town to the Barons of Thun; it was devastated several times during the Thirty Years' War.

In the 18th century, Děčín (Tetschen) followed fashion and became a spa town under Baron Johann Joseph Thun. He searched the area for a suitable spring and found one in the nearby village of Horní Žleb (Obergrund) in 1768. The centre of a busy trading hub was not, however, the ideal place to build a spa. The idea was eventually dropped in 1922. In the 21st century the town's spa past has been largely forgotten.

To promote trade, the Elbe Valley railway line was completed in 1851, which stimulated development along the left bank of the river. Soon, neighbouring Bodenbach (Podmokly) grew bigger than Tetschen and received town privileges in 1901. Following World War I, since 1918, the area was part of Czechoslovakia. Upon the 1938 Munich Agreement, both towns were annexed by Nazi Germany, incorporated into the Reichsgau Sudetenland, and merged in 1942. Under German occupation, a Gestapo prison and a forced labour camp were located in the city. After the war, the ethnic German population was expelled under terms of the 1945 Potsdam Agreement and the Beneš decrees.

In August 2002, extreme weather conditions led to extensive flooding all across Europe, and Děčín was also badly hit. Water levels rose from their usual two meters to 12 meters; five barges broke loose from their moorings and threatened to break apart a town bridge and float toward Dresden before demolition experts sank them with explosives. At one point 1,600 people were evacuated. The historic center and also many of the tourist spots are at higher elevations, so they were left undamaged, preserving part of the city's economic base. But many lower lying buildings were ruined.

Demographics

Transport and economy
Nearby, there is an important border crossing of the Elbe Valley railway en route to Dresden in Germany. Děčín station is about 83 minutes north of Prague by rail. A parallel highway along the Elbe across the border to Bad Schandau was laid out by the Germans in 1938. All cargo transported by rail, road, and water passes through the city.

Products made in Děčín include sheet-metal, food, textiles, chemicals, soap, beer and preserved fish; the city is also home to printing and publishing companies.

Sights
 Synagogue, 1907
 Renaissance-era bridge
 Holy Rood Church, 1687–1691
 "Sheep's Bridge", 1620

Děčín Castle

Děčín Castle is one of the most popular sights in the region. It is located on a hill near the city centre and overlooks the Elbe. Not later than in 1128, it was constructed as a wooden fortress, and replaced by a royal stone castle in the 13th century. In the 16th century, a grand Renaissance palace was constructed on the site, to be renovated in the Baroque style from the 17th century onward.

From 1628, the castle served as the administrative centre of the Thun und Hohenstein family. They built an unusual feature of the castle – the long, straight-walled road leading up to it, known as the "Long Ride" (Dlouhá jízda). The last major renovation was completed in 1803. In 1835, Frédéric Chopin wrote his Waltz in A-flat major, Op. 34 No. 1 here.

In 1932, financial problems forced the Thun und Hohenstein family to sell the castle to the Czechoslovak state. It served as army barracks, then it was appropriated by occupying Germans as a military garrison during World War II. Lastly, it was occupied by Soviet troops, who invaded from the east and rousted the Germans.

The Soviet Army departed in 1991, leaving the castle in a state of disrepair. In 2005, the government completed a restoration of a large part of the castle and opened it as a museum and venue for private gatherings and public events.

Hunger stone
In the river Elbe near the left bank stands a  basalt hunger stone, which is visible only when water levels are low. This is usually an indicator of drought in the region. It is known as the Hunger Stone, because in olden times, when it appeared, all boat traffic on the river had to come to a halt because of low water levels.

The interruption of trade meant that people would suffer a lack of food and other supplies. The lowest water levels have been marked on the stone since 1417, and the markings from 1616 on are still legible. The stone carries the inscription, in German, "If you see me, then cry" (Wenn Du mich siehst, dann weine).

Notable people

Anton Kern (1710–1747), painter
Johann Münzberg (1799–1878), textile manufacturer in Bohemia
Miroslav Tyrš (1832–1884), founder of the Sokol physical education
Franz, Prince of Thun and Hohenstein (1847–1916), Austro-Hungarian politician 
Adolf Wilhelm (1864–1950), Austrian classical philologist and epigrapher
Johann Radon (1887–1956), mathematician
Julius Arigi (1891–1985), Austro-Hungarian fighter pilot
Maria Paudler (1903–1990), German actress
Hans-Georg Münzberg (1916–2000), German engineer 
Egon Klepsch (1930–2010), German politician
Wolfgang Jeschke (1936–2015), German sci-fi author 
Jiří Bartoška (born 1947), actor and the president of the Karlovy Vary International Film Festival
Dana Chladek (born 1963), American slalom kayaker
Jaroslava Fabiánová (born 1965), serial killer
Vladimír Šmicer (born 1973), footballer
Jan Švec (born 1975), media pedagogue
Karolína Kurková (born 1984), model

Twin towns – sister cities

Děčín is twinned with:
 Bełchatów, Poland
 Jonava, Lithuania
 Pirna, Germany
 Přerov, Czech Republic
 Ružomberok, Slovakia

Gallery

References

External links

Děčín Castle
Děčín ZOO
Virtual show
Tetschen, Bohemia Historical Map of 1615 by Petrus Bertius

 
Cities and towns in the Czech Republic
Populated places in Děčín District
Elbe Sandstone Mountains
Populated riverside places in the Czech Republic
Populated places on the Elbe